Liu Jun  may refer to:

Liu Jun, Prince Shixing (429–453), imperial prince of the Liu Song dynasty
Liu Jun (Liu Song) or Emperor Xiaowu of Liu Song (430–464)
Liu Jun (Southern Han) (9th-century–10th-century), chancellor of Southern Han
Liu Jun (Northern Han) (926–968), emperor of Northern Han
Liu Jun (painter), Ming dynasty painter
Jun S. Liu (born 1965), Chinese-American statistician
Liu Jun (badminton) (born 1968), Chinese badminton player
Liu Jun (basketball) (born 1969), Chinese basketball player
Liu Jun (banker) (born 1972), Chinese banker and politician
Liu Jun (go player) (1975–2004), winner of the 1996 and 1997 World Amateur Go Championship
Liu Jun (footballer) (born 1983), Chinese football goalkeeper
Jun Liu (born 1997), also known as Liu Jun (choreographer), Malaysian choreographer, singer, dancer.